Ekaterina Khilko (born 25 March 1982) is a trampoline gymnast from Uzbekistan. She won a bronze medal at the 2008 Summer Olympics, having previously finished in fourth place at the 2000 Summer Olympics.  She also competed at the 2004 and 2012 Summer Olympics.

References

1982 births
Living people
Uzbekistani female trampolinists
Gymnasts at the 2000 Summer Olympics
Gymnasts at the 2004 Summer Olympics
Gymnasts at the 2008 Summer Olympics
Gymnasts at the 2012 Summer Olympics
Gymnasts at the 2016 Summer Olympics
Olympic gymnasts of Uzbekistan
Olympic bronze medalists for Uzbekistan
Olympic medalists in gymnastics
Medalists at the 2008 Summer Olympics
Asian Games medalists in gymnastics
Gymnasts at the 2006 Asian Games
Gymnasts at the 2010 Asian Games
Gymnasts at the 2014 Asian Games
Asian Games bronze medalists for Uzbekistan
Medalists at the 2006 Asian Games
Medalists at the 2010 Asian Games
Medalists at the Trampoline Gymnastics World Championships
Competitors at the 2009 World Games
20th-century Uzbekistani women
21st-century Uzbekistani women